Square Enix is a Japanese video game development and publishing company formed from the merger on April 1, 2003 of video game developer Square and publisher Enix. The company is best known for its role-playing video game franchises, which include the Final Fantasy series, the Dragon Quest series, and the action-RPG Kingdom Hearts series. Of its properties, the Final Fantasy franchise is the best-selling, with a total worldwide sales of over 173 million units. The Dragon Quest series has sold over 85 million units worldwide and is one of the most popular video game series in Japan, while the Kingdom Hearts series has shipped 36 million copies worldwide. Since its inception, the company has developed or published hundreds of titles in various video game franchises on numerous gaming systems.

Square Enix has owned Taito, which continues to publish its own video games, since September 2005, and acquired game publisher Eidos Interactive in April 2009, which has been merged with Square Enix's European publishing wing and renamed as Square Enix Europe. This list includes games developed or published by Square Enix after its formation and released for mobile platforms such as non-smartphone mobile phones, mobile operating systems such as iOS and Android, or the GREE service, rather than as retail games. This list does not include games published by Taito and Square Enix Europe. As not all games have been made available by Square Enix for sale or download worldwide, this list denotes if a game has been released in Japan, North America, and the PAL region.

Games

References

External links
 Official European game list
 Official North American game list
 Official Japanese game list 

Square Enix